Joachim Fritsche (born 28 October 1951) is a retired East German football player.

He was part of the East German team for their only World Cup appearance in West Germany 1974. He earned a total of 14 caps during his career. Fritsche played in the East German top-flight for 1. FC Lokomotive Leipzig and BSG Chemie Leipzig.

References

External links
 
 

1951 births
Living people
German footballers
East German footballers
East Germany international footballers
1974 FIFA World Cup players
1. FC Lokomotive Leipzig players
FC Sachsen Leipzig players
DDR-Oberliga players
Association football defenders